Jankiewicz is a Polish surname. Notable people with the surname include:

 Jan Jankiewicz (born 1955), Polish cyclist
 Tom Jankiewicz (1963–2013), American screenwriter

See also
 Jackiewicz

Polish-language surnames
Patronymic surnames
Surnames from given names